Schlingeriella is a genus of small-headed flies (insects in the family Acroceridae). It contains only one species, Schlingeriella irwini, endemic to New Caledonia.

The genus is named in honor of Evert I. Schlinger, who collected specimens of the species and was also an expert on Acroceridae. The species is named in honor of the entomologist Michael E. Irwin.

References

Acroceridae
Nemestrinoidea genera
Monotypic Brachycera genera
Insects of New Caledonia